The 68th Network Warfare Squadron is part of the United States Air Force. It was previously called the 68th Information Operations Squadron, but as of mid-2008, the name changed to the 68th Network Warfare Squadron.

Until 2011, the 68 NWS was assigned to Brooks City-Base.  Due to the 2005 Base Realignment and Closure Commission all Air Force units left prior to September 2011.  The 68 NWS relocated to Lackland AFB in June 2011.

Lineage
 Constituted 958th Signal Radio Intelligence Company, Aviation, on 9 Oct 1942.
 Activated on 1 Nov 1942.
 Redesignated 8th Radio Squadron, Mobile (J) on 19 Feb 1944
 Redesignated 8th Radio Squadron, Mobile on 14 Nov 1946
 Inactivated on 8 May 1955
 Disbanded on 15 Jun 1983
 Reconstituted, and consolidated (1 Oct 1993) with the 6906th Security Squadron, which was designated, and activated, on 1 Nov 1977
 Redesignated 6906th Electronic Security Squadron on 1 Aug 1979
 Redesignated 68th Intelligence Squadron on 1 Oct 1993
 Redesignated 68th Information Operations Squadron on 1 Aug 2000.
 Redesignated 68th Network Warfare Squadron on xx Xxx 2008.

Location
 Drew Field, FL, 1 Nov 1942;
 Camp Pinedale, CA, 24 Jan 1943-Oct 1944;
 Guam, 17 Oct 1944-6 Nov 1945;
 Washington, DC, 6 Nov 1945;
 Vint Hill Farms Station, Warrenton, VA, 5 Mar 1946;
 Brooks AFB, TX, 23 Feb 1949;
 Kelly AFB, TX, 1 Aug 1953;
 Brooks AFB, TX 22 Mar-8 May 1955.
 Brooks AFB [later, Brooks City-Base], TX, 1 Nov 1977-2011
 Lackland AFB, 2011–present.

See also
 List of cyber warfare forces

Military units and formations in Texas
Information Operations 0068